The pealip redhorse (Moxostoma pisolabrum) is a species of ray-finned fish in the genus Moxostoma.

Footnotes 
 

Moxostoma
Fish described in 1951